Hiroshi Umemura (born February 22, 1972) is a Japanese mixed martial artist. He competed in the Bantamweight and Featherweight division.

Mixed martial arts record

|-
| Loss
| align=center| 11-8-3
| Masakazu Imanari
| Submission (heel hook)
| Deep: 37 Impact
| 
| align=center| 1
| align=center| 0:29
| Tokyo, Japan
| 
|-
| Win
| align=center| 11-7-3
| Kunihiro Watanabe
| Submission (rear naked choke)
| Deep: clubDeep Nagoya: MB3z Impact, All Stand Up
| 
| align=center| 1
| align=center| 1:19
| Nagoya, Aichi, Japan
| 
|-
| Win
| align=center| 10-7-3
| Seo Su In
| Submission (rear-naked choke)
| Heat: Heat 4
| 
| align=center| 1
| align=center| 1:52
| Nagoya, Aichi, Japan
| 
|-
| Win
| align=center| 9-7-3
| Takamaro Watari
| Submission (rear naked choke)
| Shooto: Gig Central 12
| 
| align=center| 1
| align=center| 2:03
| Nagoya, Aichi, Japan
| 
|-
| Win
| align=center| 8-7-3
| Shinobu Aoyama
| TKO (punches)
| Deep: clubDeep Toyama: Barbarian Festival 5
| 
| align=center| 2
| align=center| 0:39
| Toyama, Japan
| 
|-
| Win
| align=center| 7-7-3
| Alexandre Shevtsov
| TKO (punches)
| Shooto: Gig Central 10
| 
| align=center| 1
| align=center| 1:05
| Nagoya, Aichi, Japan
| 
|-
| Win
| align=center| 6-7-3
| Yuichiro Shirai
| Submission (rear naked choke)
| Deep: clubDeep Nagoya: MB3z Impact, Di Entrare
| 
| align=center| 1
| align=center| 4:07
| Tokyo
| 
|-
| Win
| align=center| 5-7-3
| Manabu Kano
| Submission (rear naked choke)
| Shooto: Gig Central 8
| 
| align=center| 1
| align=center| 3:01
| Tokyo, Japan
| 
|-
| Win
| align=center| 4-7-3
| Ryuichi Nozawa
| Submission (rear-naked choke)
| Deep: clubDeep Toyama: Barbarian Festival 2
| 
| align=center| 1
| align=center| 1:34
| Toyama, Japan
| 
|-
| Draw
| align=center| 3-7-3
| Motoyuki Takinishi
| Draw
| Deep: Hero 1
| 
| align=center| 2
| align=center| 5:00
| Tokyo
| 
|-
| Loss
| align=center| 3-7-2
| Kenji Osawa
| Decision (unanimous)
| Shooto: Gig Central 6
| 
| align=center| 2
| align=center| 5:00
| Nagoya, Aichi, Japan
| 
|-
| Loss
| align=center| 3-6-2
| Yoshiro Maeda
| Submission (armbar)
| Deep: 14th Impact
| 
| align=center| 1
| align=center| 2:26
| Osaka
| 
|-
| Loss
| align=center| 3-5-2
| Hiroyuki Tanaka
| Submission (triangle choke)
| Shooto: Gig Central 4
| 
| align=center| 2
| align=center| 4:21
| Nagoya, Aichi, Japan
| 
|-
| Win
| align=center| 3-4-2
| Hiroki Kita
| Decision (unanimous)
| Shooto: Gig Central 3
| 
| align=center| 2
| align=center| 5:00
| Nagoya, Aichi, Japan
| 
|-
| Draw
| align=center| 2-4-2
| Seiji Ozuka
| Draw
| Shooto: Gig East 7
| 
| align=center| 2
| align=center| 5:00
| Tokyo, Japan
| 
|-
| Loss
| align=center| 2-4-1
| Ryota Matsune
| Decision (unanimous)
| Shooto: Gig East 5
| 
| align=center| 2
| align=center| 5:00
| Tokyo, Japan
| 
|-
| Loss
| align=center| 2-3-1
| Daiji Takahashi
| Submission (rear-naked choke)
| Shooto: Gig East 2
| 
| align=center| 2
| align=center| 3:51
| Tokyo, Japan
| 
|-
| Draw
| align=center| 2-2-1
| Masashi Kameda
| Draw
| Shooto: Gig West 1
| 
| align=center| 2
| align=center| 5:00
| Osaka, Japan
| 
|-
| Loss
| align=center| 2-2
| Katsuya Toida
| Submission (armbar)
| Shooto: R.E.A.D. 12
| 
| align=center| 1
| align=center| 2:07
| Tokyo, Japan
| 
|-
| Loss
| align=center| 2-1
| Tetsuo Katsuta
| Decision (unanimous)
| Shooto: R.E.A.D. 10
| 
| align=center| 2
| align=center| 5:00
| Tokyo, Japan
| 
|-
| Win
| align=center| 2-0
| Fumio Usami
| TKO (punches)
| Shooto: R.E.A.D. 3
| 
| align=center| 1
| align=center| 2:03
| Kadoma, Osaka, Japan
| 
|-
| Win
| align=center| 1-0
| Takeru Ueno
| Decision (split)
| Shooto: Shooter's Ambition
| 
| align=center| 2
| align=center| 5:00
| Setagaya, Tokyo, Japan
|

See also
List of male mixed martial artists

References

1972 births
Japanese male mixed martial artists
Bantamweight mixed martial artists
Featherweight mixed martial artists
Living people